Leotrim Bekteshi (born 21 April 1992) is a Kosovan professional footballer who plays as a centre-back for Football Superleague of Kosovo club Ballkani.

Club career

Prishtina
On 31 May 2018, Bekteshi signed a two-year contract with Football Superleague of Kosovo club Prishtina. On 26 August 2018, he made his debut in a 2–0 away win against Trepça '89 after being named in the starting line-up.

Mjøndalen
On 16 February 2022, Bekteshi joined Norwegian First Division side Mjøndalen. On 4 April 2022, he made his debut in a 1–0 home win against Kongsvinger after being named in the starting line-up. On 13 August 2022, Bekteshi had his contract terminated by mutual consent.

Ballkani
On 27 August 2022, Bekteshi signed a two-year contract with Football Superleague of Kosovo club Ballkani. His debut with Ballkani came twelve days later in the 2022–23 UEFA Europa Conference League group stage against CFR Cluj after coming on as a substitute at 79th minute in place of Qëndrim Zyba.

International career
On 24 December 2019, Bekteshi received a call-up from Kosovo for the friendly match against Sweden, and made his debut after being named in the starting line-up.

Personal life
Bekteshi was born in Berlin, Germany from Kosovo Albanian parents from Mitrovica.

References

External links

1992 births
Living people
German people of Kosovan descent
German people of Albanian descent
Kosovan footballers
German footballers
Footballers from Berlin
Association football central defenders
Kosovo international footballers
Football Superleague of Kosovo players
2. Liga (Slovakia) players
Norwegian First Division players
KF Trepça'89 players
KF Besa players
SC Gjilani players
FC Prishtina players
KF Ballkani players
FK Iskra Borčice players
Mjøndalen IF players
Kosovan expatriate footballers
German expatriate footballers
Kosovan expatriate sportspeople in Slovakia
German expatriate sportspeople in Slovakia
Expatriate footballers in Slovakia
Kosovan expatriate sportspeople in Norway
German expatriate sportspeople in Norway
Expatriate footballers in Norway